Los Angeles is a handball club from Los Angeles.

History
The club was found in 2001.

LATHC participated at the 2019 IHF North American and Caribbean Super Globe Qualifier.

LATHC has its home court and training at the indoor practice grounds of MLS side Los Angeles Galaxy in Torrance, California.

LATHC won the 2020 Valley of the Sun team handball tournament in Tempe, Arizona immediately before the COVID-19 pandemic.

Accomplishments 
USA Team Handball Nationals
Men's Elite Division
 : 2010
 : 2012, 2014
Men's Open Division I
 : 2018
 : 2003
Men's Open Division II
 : 2002

Roster

References

External links

Handball clubs established in 2001
2001 establishments in California
American handball clubs